For Lists of obelisks, see:
 List of Egyptian obelisks
 List of modern obelisks
 List of obelisks in Rome